Benkendorf is a village and a former municipality in the district Altmarkkreis Salzwedel, in Saxony-Anhalt, Germany. Since 1 January 2009, it is part of the town Salzwedel.
It derives its name from the ancient noble Benkendorf family, who descend from Johannes De Benkendorpe who lived around the year 1240. They are considered to be one of the oldest and most respected lower noble families in Germany. Variations in spelling include, Benkendorf(f), Benckendorf(f), Beneckendorf(f), Beckendorf(f), von Benkendorf(f) und von Hindenburg, von Beneckendorf(f) und von Hindenburg and several others. Some of the branches use the predicate of von, others however do not.

Former municipalities in Saxony-Anhalt
Salzwedel